The Senate Committee on Pacific Railroads is a defunct committee of the United States Senate. It was first established as a select committee in 1889 and became a standing committee on March 15, 1893. The committee is not to be confused with the Committee on the Pacific Railroad, which existed from 1861 to 1873.

The committee was appointed following an investigation into the finances of the Union Pacific Railroad, which was heavily indebted to the United States Government. The committee was terminated on April 18, 1921.

Chairmen 1863-1921
1893-1895: Calvin S. Brice, D-Ohio
1895-1900: John H. Gear, R-Iowa
1901-1905: Jonathan Dolliver, R-Iowa
1905-1907: Russell A. Alger, R-Michigan
1907-1911: Elmer J. Burkett, R-Nebraska
1911-1913: Robert L. Owen, D-Oklahoma
1913-1919: Frank B. Brandegee, R-Connecticut
1919-1921: Charles S. Thomas, D-Colorado

References 

Pacific Railroads
1889 establishments in the United States
1921 disestablishments
History of rail transportation in the United States